The Nasse Strahlegg (3,485 m) is a peak of the Bernese Alps, located east of the Finsteraarjoch in the canton of Bern. It is the culminating point of the small range descending from the south-west ridge of the Lauteraarhorn, between the valleys of the Lower Grindelwald Glacier and the Unteraar Glacier.

References

External links
 Nasse Strahlegg on Hikr

Bernese Alps
Mountains of the Alps
Alpine three-thousanders
Mountains of the canton of Bern
Mountains of Switzerland